Stuart Metcalfe (born 6 October 1950 – August 2020 was an English footballer who played as a central midfielder.

Metcalfe, a talented midfielder, began his career with his local club Blackburn Rovers in 1967. He would become one of the pillars of the club during the 1970s, part of a trio of players who stayed loyal to the club through the decade including Tony Parkes and Derek Fazackerley. His midfield partnership with Tony Parkes was instrumental in the club's Third Division championship in 1975. After leaving Blackburn in 1980, he joined Carlisle United before joining American Soccer League club Carolina Lightnin' in 1981. A brief spell at Crewe Alexandra and a return to Blackburn followed before leaving League football to play for Chorley

References

External links
Career Stats

1950 births
Living people
American Soccer League (1933–1983) players
English footballers
English expatriate footballers
Blackburn Rovers F.C. players
Carlisle United F.C. players
Carolina Lightnin' players
Chorley F.C. players
Crewe Alexandra F.C. players
Association football midfielders
English expatriate sportspeople in the United States
Expatriate soccer players in the United States